Jan Ahmad (also Romanized as Jān Aḩmad) is a village in Zohan Rural District, Zohan District, Zirkuh County, South Khorasan Province, Iran. At the 2006 census, its population was 398, in 106 families.

References 

Populated places in Zirkuh County